This is a list of Albanian academics.

Academics
 Eshref Ademaj (1940–1994)
 Fatmir Agalliu (1933–1998)
 Idriz Ajeti (1917–2019)
 Gëzim Alpion (born 1962)
 Mehdi Bardhi (1927–1994)
 Anton Berisha (born 1946)
 Eqrem Çabej (1908–1980)
 Shaban Demiraj (1920–2014)
 Albert Doja (born 1957)
 Andrea Ekonomi (1879–1934)
 Ibrahim Gashi (born 1963)
 Petro Janura (1911–1983)
 Dhori Kule (born 1957)
 Skënder Luarasi (1900–1982)
 Sehadete Mekuli (1928–2013)
 Paskal Milo (born 1949)
 Adrian Neritani (born 1967)
 Edmond Panariti (born 1960)
 Ylli Pango (born 1952)
 Aurel Plasari (born 1956)
 Rexhep Qosja (born 1936)
 Namik Resuli (1908–1985)
 Dhimitër Shuteriqi (1915–2003)
 Abdulla Tafa (1947–2015)
 Myqerem Tafaj (born 1957)
 Xhezair Teliti (born 1948)
 Kolë Xhumari (1912–2006)

Albanian academics
Academics